Mr. Boggs Steps Out is a 1938 American romantic comedy film directed by Gordon Wiles. The film is based on the Clarence Budington Kelland Saturday Evening Post short story Face the Facts. The working titles of the film were Face the Facts and Mr. Boggs Buys a Barrel.

Plot
Government statistician Oliver Boggs wins a large monetary prize from a cinema for correctly guessing the amount of beans in a barrel. His elder business associate advises him to leave his dead end depressing job and do something rewarding. When the pair's boss abuses the elder man, Boggs quits and decides to purchase a barrel manufacturing company in a small town. Boggs discovers that all the business in the town is dead due to the Great Depression. Boggs and his barrel company adviser Oleander Tubbs bring in a variety of unusual methods and ingenuity to bring prosperity to the town.

Cast 
Stuart Erwin as Oliver Boggs
Helen Chandler as Oleander Tubbs
Toby Wing as Irene Lee
Tully Marshall as Morton Ross
Spencer Charters as Angus Tubbs
Otis Harlan as Abner Katz
Walter Byron as Dennis Andrews
Peter Potter as Bob DeBrette
Harry Tyler as Sam Mason
Milburn Stone as Burns
Nora Cecil as Widow Peddia
Harrison Greene as Mr. Pry
Elliot Fisher as Tommy Mason
Eddie Kane as Theatre Manager
Wilson Benge as The Butler
Mike Jeffries as Chauffeur
Isabel La Mal as Mrs. Mason
Betty Mack as Miss Feathrewell
Otto Hoffman as Jenkins

External links 

1938 films
American black-and-white films
1938 romantic comedy films
Grand National Films films
Films directed by Gordon Wiles
American romantic comedy films
Films based on short fiction
1930s English-language films
1930s American films